The jewelled south-west ctenotus (Ctenotus gemmula)  is a species of skink found in Western Australia.

References

grandis
Reptiles described in 1974
Taxa named by Glen Milton Storr